Brandin Adar Knight (born December 16, 1981) is an American basketball coach and former player who is associate head coach for the Rutgers Scarlet Knights. He is the brother of Brevin Knight.

A 6'0" point guard, Knight played for the Pittsburgh Panthers men's basketball team, where he scored 1,440 career points. He was one of ten players named to the 2002–03 Wooden All-American team and was Associated Press honorable mention All-American that same season. Knight was also selected as an Associated Press Third Team All-American and Sporting News Second Team All-American  in 2002–02.

In 2001–02, Knight was named Big East Conference co-Player of the Year, Big East Most Improved Player, First Team All-Big East, and was named to the All-Big East tournament team. Knight achieved Second Team All-Big East honors in 2002–04. He was a two-time United States Basketball Writers Association (USBWA) All-Region selection (2001–02 and 2003–04) and a USBWA/NABC All-District Team selection in 2001–02. He won the USBWA Region Player of the Year in 2001–02.

Knight finished his career at Pitt holding the school records for career assists (785), career assist average (6.2 assists per game), career steals (298), season assists (251 in 2001–02), and season minutes played (1,284 in 2001–02). Knight's #20 jersey was retired by Pitt prior to the Marquette game on March 4, 2009.

He played professionally for two seasons with the Asheville Altitude of the NBDL. Knight signed a contract with the NBA's Houston Rockets, but suffered an injury two weeks later that effectively ended his playing career.

Knight grew up in East Orange, New Jersey, and played high school ball at Seton Hall Preparatory School in West Orange, New Jersey.

Knight worked as Director of Basketball Operations for the Pittsburgh men's basketball team during the 2007–08 season and was promoted in June 2008 to an assistant coach following the departure of Orlando Antigua to the University of Memphis' coaching staff.

On April 13, 2016, Knight was officially introduced as the new assistant head coach for Rutgers following eight seasons at Pittsburgh.

References

1981 births
Living people
African-American basketball players
All-American college men's basketball players
American men's basketball players
Asheville Altitude players
Basketball players from New Jersey
Houston Rockets players
People from Livingston, New Jersey
Pittsburgh Panthers men's basketball coaches
Pittsburgh Panthers men's basketball players
Point guards
Rutgers Scarlet Knights men's basketball coaches
Seton Hall Preparatory School alumni
Sportspeople from East Orange, New Jersey
Undrafted National Basketball Association players
21st-century African-American sportspeople
20th-century African-American people